Rajendra College, Chapra is a government college in Chapra district of Bihar, India, established in 1938. The college is named after the first President of India, Deshratna Dr. Rajendra Prasad. It is the senior most constituent unit of Jai Prakash University. The college offers intermediate, UG, & PG level studies. It is also affiliated with Bihar School Examination Board for intermediate board exams.

Departments
College has five faculties:

Faculty of Humanities
Hindi
 English
Sanskrit
Urdu
Philosophy

Faculty of Science
Physics
Chemistry
Mathematics
Botany
Zoology

Faculty of Social Science
Economics
Political Science
History
Geography
Psychology

Faculty of Commerce

Faculty of Vocational Studies

Notable Faculties 

 Manoranjan Prasad Sinha

References

External links

Memorials to Rajendra Prasad
Constituent colleges of Jai Prakash University
1938 establishments in India
Colleges in India
Educational institutions established in 1938